The Chongqing West railway station is a railway station of Chengyu Passenger Railway that is located in Shapingba District of Chongqing, People's Republic of China. It is the second largest railway station, after Xi'an North, in South Western China when opened on January 25, 2018. It will serve as Chongqing's connection with many destinations across south-western and north-western China. Situated in Shangqiao area of Shapingba, near the intersections of the G93 Chengdu–Chongqing Ring Expressway and the G85 Chongqing–Kunming Expressways. This is the third major railway station to serve Chongqing, after Chongqing North and Chongqing Stations. It opened in conjunction with the smaller nearby Shapingba station on the same day.

It will serve as a stop on the Chongqing–Lanzhou High-Speed Railway, Xiangyang-Chongqing Railway, Chongqing–Guizhou High-Speed Railway, Chongqing-Kunming Railway and Chengdu–Chongqing Railway.

History

 June 4, 2007, Chongqing Municipal government & mayor, with the Office of the Planning, announced the intent to construct a third passenger station with the site for a new Chongqing transport hub discussed.
 June 5, 2007, Chongqing Media reported that the railway station would be tentatively named "New Chongqing".
 2009, Chongqing official stated that the "New Chongqing" name would change to "Chongqing West railway Station".
 August 23, 2010, The 79th session of the Chongqing municipal government announced the preliminary adoption of the Chongqing West railway station design scheme.
 December 2014, Chongqing West railway station officially started construction.
 December 31, 2017, Chongqing West railway station held a New Year's Eve light ceremony in the East Square.
 January 25, 2018, Chongqing West railway station opened to the public.

Station Structure

Station Hall
Chongqing West Station has been constructed as a national Principal station. Constructed over 3 years, starting in 2014, it covers an area of 120,000 square metres, with a T-shaped exterior facade. Consisting of 6 floors, 3 above and 3 below ground. It will be expected to handle 15,000 people at any single time within the main hall complex.

 The total building area of the station building is nearly 119600 square meters. 
 The main Northern and Southern sides have a width of 276 meters, with the narrowest place being 150 meters. 
 The Eastern and Western sides have a length of 420 meters. 
 The total height of the station hall is 37 meters at an elevation of 33 meters.

Chongqing West Station adopts the modern Chinese practice with high speed railway stations with a "comprehensive traffic, three-dimensional layout". This refers to having the Waiting Hall, Platforms and Arrivals Halls on separate levels. The Station Hall has divided across five layers, with the main railway passenger station hall, a long-distance bus station, local city bus station, metro, taxi station, rental vehicles and private vehicle parking facilities.

 The top two floors above ground are fitted out as the main railway station Waiting Hall.
 Platforms are located on the middle level of the building at ground level. It also features the ticket hall, public squares on both sides, long-distance bus station and local city bus stop.
 Below ground level is the Arrivals Hall and Chongqing Rail Transit metro system Ticket Office.
 The underground Minus Two level provides transfer with the CRT Line 5  (Under Construction) 
 The underground Minus Three level provides transfer with the CRT Loop Line  (Under Construction)

Platform Layout
Chongqing West Station consists of 15 platforms (1 side platform, 14 island platforms) that serve 29 tracks.

Naming Confusion
This station should not be confused with the nearby Shapingba railway station in the same district of Chongqing. This is an existing station renovated for Chengdu–Chongqing Intercity Railway services and opened on the same day, January 25, 2018. During the planning phases, there were discussions about combining Shapingba Station and the proposed Chongqing West into one large station either on the existing Shapingba Station site or a new site where the current Chongqing West Station was constructed. This has led to the name "Chongqing West Station" or "Shapingba" being applied to both proposed station locations at various times during planning, leading to some confusion between the two sites. It was later determined that there was enough rail traffic for both stations to co-exist.

Metro station

It is served by Line 5 (Southern section) and Loop line, which opened on 20 January 2021.

Station structure
There are 2 island platforms at this station. The two outer ones are used for Line 5 trains and through service Express trains from/to Loop line, while the other two inner ones are used for Loop line trains only. Same direction cross-platform interchange is provided between the two metro lines.

References

Railway stations in Chongqing
Stations on the Chengdu–Chongqing Intercity Railway
Railway stations in China opened in 2018